2'''-acetyl-6'''-hydroxyneomycin C deacetylase (neoL (gene)) is an enzyme with systematic name 2'''-acetyl-6'''-hydroxyneomycin C hydrolase (acetate-forming). This enzyme catalyses the following chemical reaction

 2'''-acetyl-6'''-deamino-6'''-hydroxyneomycin C + H2O  6'''-deamino-6'''-hydroxyneomycin C + acetate

This enzyme is involved in biosynthesis of aminoglycoside antibiotics of the [neomycin] family.

References

External links 
 

EC 3.5.1